The 2-millimeter band is a portion of the EHF (microwave) radio spectrum internationally allocated to amateur radio and amateur satellite use.  The band is between 134 GHz and 141 GHz.

Due to the lack of commercial off the shelf radios, amateurs who operate on the 2 mm band must design and construct their own equipment, and those who do, often attempt to set communication distance records for the band.

Allocation 
The International Telecommunication Union allocates 134 GHz to 141 GHz to amateur radio and amateur satellites.  Amateurs operate on a primary basis between 134 GHz and 136 GHz and on a secondary basis in the rest of the band.  As such, amateurs must protect the radio astronomy and radiolocation services from harmful interference, which share the band with amateurs between 136 GHz and 141 GHz.  The ITU's allocations are the same in all three ITU Regions.

List of notable frequencies 
134.930 GHz Narrow band calling frequency

History 
The allocation was introduced as a result of changes at ITU's World Radiocommunication Conference 2000. Prior to this the amateur allocation was 142-144 GHz Primary and 144-149 GHz Secondary.

Distance records 

In Australia, the 2 mm distance record was  set by stations VK3CV and VK3NH on June 11, 2020.

See also 
Amateur radio frequency allocations

References

External links 
 UK Microwave Group's 134 GHz page
 First 134 GHz VUCC - Mount Greylock Expeditionary Force
 An Example of Gear for the 145GHz Amateur Band - Mount Greylock Expeditionary Force

Amateur radio bands